Electric Loco Shed, Vijayawada is a motive power depot performing locomotive maintenance and repair facility for electric locomotives of the Indian Railways, located at Vijayawada of the South Central Railway zone in Andhra Pradesh, India.

Locomotives

References

Vijayawada
 Vijayawada